Capital Department is a department located in the center-north of the Tucumán Province, Argentina. At the 2001 census, its population was 527,607 and its population density was 5,862/km².  The city of San Miguel de Tucumán covers almost all of the 90 km² of the department’s area. It is the smallest department in area, but the most populated as well.

Geography
The entire department lies on a plain presenting a gentle slope heading toward the Salí River located at the east end.

Adjacent departments
Tafí Viejo Department – north
Cruz Alta Department – east
Lules Department – south and southwest 
Yerba Buena Department – west

See also
San Miguel de Tucumán

Departments of Tucumán Province